The Democratic Party of Russia or DPR (Demokraticheskaya Partiya Rossii) is a conservative Russian political party that was founded in 1990. Under the leadership of Andrey Bogdanov, the party advocated the entry of Russia into the European Union. In 2008, the party merged with several others to form the Right Cause. It was re-established as a party and officially registered again in 2012.

History
The Democratic Party of Russia was founded by Nikolay Travkin. Other early leaders included Stanislav Govorukhin and Sergey Glazyev. In the 1990s it was a prominent democratically oriented party holding seats in the first State Duma and was a member of the Democratic Russia coalition. After the coup in 1991, the party evolved from liberal anticommunism to centrism (1992–1993) and later to moderate Russian nationalism (1994–1995).

In 1991, the Democratic Party differed from other liberal/democratic organizations with its 'demopatriotic' stance (similar to Aksyuchits' Christian-Democratic Party and Astafyev's Constitutional Democrats). The Democratic Party was opposed to the dissolution of the Soviet Union and criticised Latvia's and Estonia's policies towards their Russian-speaking minorities. After the signing of the Belovezhye treaty, the DP organized a number of demonstrations against the treaty.

In the 1993 parliamentary elections in Russia, the party received 5.52% of the Proportional Representation ballot vote (2,969,533 votes) as well as 2.1% (1,094,066 votes) of votes on individual district ballots. This translated into 14 and 7 seats, respectively, for a total of 21 seats in the 450-seat Duma.

The party's stance on Yegor Gaidar's economic reforms was confusing but developed more critical in the course of time. During the 1993 Russian constitutional crisis, the party did not have a unanimous position. The party called for balloting both for the re-election of the President as well as of the legislative bodies on the referendum in April 1993; however, some of the party's leaders took the pro-Yeltsin side. Similarly, during the October 1993 events in Moscow, Travkin initially supported the so-called zero variants (annulling both Yeltsin's decree nr 1400 and the Supreme Soviet's subsequent decisions). On 4 October, Travkin supported Yeltsin's actions in suppressing the armed rebellion. The party took part in the 1993 Russian legislative election and won 14 seats. The party split, however, on the issue of support for the Chernomyrdin cabinet. Travkin who took a more conciliatory stand lost the power struggle to Govorukhin and Glazyev, who were determined opponents of the government course, and Travkin consequently left the party and joined the Our Home is Russia movement.

Glazyev was made the leader in 1994 but was disbanded before the following year's legislative election. The rump DRP split further between Govorukhin and Glazyev supporters. In the 1995 Russian legislative election, the Glazyev wing took part within the Congress of Russian Communities list, whilst Govorukhin formed his own list, called the Stanislav Govorukhin Bloc.

In the 1996 presidential election, the Democratic Party supported Alexander Lebed, though some of its regional leaders supported Yeltsin's campaign. In the 2000 presidential election, the party supported Vladimir Putin.

In 2001 the party was reformed by Mikhail Prusak. In 2005 Mikhail Kasyanov tried to be elected chairman of the party, but lost to Andrei Vladimirovich Bogdanov. In June 2007, the party proposed a referendum on joining the European Union and in December it took part in the legislative election, but it did not win any seats. The DPR of that time was accused of being a virtual party used to draw away votes from the real opposition parties.

17 September 2007, with the support of the European People's Party in the headquarters of the European Union in Brussels, hosted the XXI Congress of the Democratic Party of Russia, which adopted the decision on the accession of Russia to the European Union.

In the 2007 Russian legislative election the party won 0.13% of votes, not breaking the 7% barrier, and thus no seats in the Duma. As of 1 January 2007, according to the Federal Registration Service, the party had 82,183 members.

According to the results of the regional elections of 2012, 2013, and 2014, the party failed to win in regional and city parliaments.

In 2014 Andrei Bogdanov head created by the participation of the Communist Party of Social Justice, leader of the Democratic Party of Russia was elected his brother Timur Bogdanov.

Electoral results

Presidential elections

Legislative elections

References

External links
Official website (Russian)

1990 establishments in Russia
1990 establishments in the Soviet Union
2008 disestablishments in Russia
2012 establishments in Russia
Conservative parties in Russia
Liberal parties in Russia
Member parties of the European People's Party
Political parties disestablished in 2008
Political parties established in 1990
Political parties established in 2012
Political parties in the Soviet Union
Pro-European political parties in Russia
Registered political parties in Russia
Soviet opposition groups